Birgit Bidder (real name Anna Åhman) is a Swedish indie musician, songwriter, arranger and artist. Known for ones distinctive voice, Birgit Bidder music often blends elements of pop, psychedelia and art rock. Various instruments can also be found in Birgit's songs, including saxophones, synthesizers, vibraphones, French horns, saw and bandoneon.

Musician 

During spring 2014 and summer 2015 Birgit Bidder performs as La Musica in Swedish opera house Wermlandsoperan's production "L'Orfeus" by Monteverdi. Directed by Kristofer Steen from Refused and arranged by Hans Ek. Other participing artists are Moto Boy and Jan Kyhle among others.

Since 2012 Birgit Bidder has performed with conductor and arranger Hans Ek and chamber orchestra Modern Fantazias, interpreting work by Brian Eno, Kraftwerk and Monteverdi among others. At venues like Drottningholms Slottsteater, Södra Teatern and music festival Sthlm music and arts.

Her song "Psalm From A Heart" is in the outro for episode 21 of the American ABC TV series Private Practice, aired May 12, 2011 in the US. 
Performed live on Swedish TV4 Nyhetsmorgon in May 2011.

Birgit Bidder toured as an opening act for Katie Melua in Scandinavia in May 2011. She has guest appeared with punk band Docenterna, Mattias Alkberg among others and opened for Loney Dear, Rebecka Törnqvist, Joel Alme, Deportees and Jakob Hellman.

Other

Birgit Bidder sings, plays the keyboard and guitar, writes and produce her Swedish act, Raketen, including Kalle Nyman on bass, Patrik Heikinpieti on drums and Mattias Alkberg live on guitar.

Discography 
As a participating musician:

 Ison & Fille: Ikväll är vi kungar, single, (Hemmalaget) 2010
 Club 8: The People's Record, CD, (Adrian) 2010
 Kajsa Grytt: "En Kvinna under Påverkan", CD, (Playground) 2011
 bob hund: Vem tror jag att jag lurar?, single, (Silence) 2012
 Kajsa Grytt: "Jag ler, jag dör", CD, (Playground) 2013
 Oskar Linnros: "För sent", single, (Universal) 2013
 Conny Nimmersjö: "Tänk, nyss var här så trevligt", CD, (Novoton) 2015

Tours
As a band musician:
 Erik Hassle: 2009–2010
 Veronica Maggio: 2010–2012
 Oskar Linnros: 2010–2011

References 

http://www.sodrateatern.com
https://web.archive.org/web/20140219181929/http://stockholmmusicandarts.com/artister/trans-europe-express/
http://www.wermlandopera.com/evenemang/lorfeo
http://www.unitedstage.se
http://www.blixten.se
http://www.novoton.se
http://www.hansek.se

External links
http://www.svt.se/nyheter/regionalt/varmland/lackert-lekfullt
http://nwt.se/kultur/2015/06/18/5-000-liter-vatten-tacker
http://www.svd.se/kultur/birgit-bidder-tar-sig-an-stockholm_6320194.svd 
http://gaffa.se/nyhet/49265 
https://web.archive.org/web/20160304000830/http://www.10tal.se/?p=4175 
http://www.kuriren.nu/noje/default.aspx?articleid=5871634
 Birgit Bidder's website

1986 births
Swedish pop singers
Living people
21st-century Swedish singers
21st-century Swedish women singers